The 1926 Richmond Spiders football team was an American football team that represented the University of Richmond as an independent during the 1926 college football season. Led by 13th-year head coach, Frank Dobson, the Spiders compiled a record of 2–7. Joe DeMotte played for Richmond. Richmond played their home games at Tate Field on Mayo Island.

Schedule

References

Richmond
Richmond Spiders football seasons
Richmond Spiders football